The Blonde Bandit is a 1949 American crime film directed by Harry Keller and written by John K. Butler. The film stars Gerald Mohr, Dorothy Patrick, Robert Rockwell, Charles Cane, Larry J. Blake and Argentina Brunetti. The film was released on December 22, 1949, by Republic Pictures.

Plot
Gloria Dell arrives in a western town looking for a man she's been corresponding with who has sent her an engagement ring, but learns he's a bigamist. A jeweler overpays Gloria for the ring, then lies that she robbed his store. The money's found on Gloria and she is placed under arrest.

A mobster, Joe Sapelli, suspects that Gloria has been framed and posts her bail. Before she leaves, a district attorney, Deveron, asks her to go undercover and expose Joe's rackets, in exchange for all charges against her being dropped. Corrupt vice-squad cops Metzger and Roberts tip off Joe, but he and Gloria surprisingly fall in love.

Deveron nabs the crooked cops and chases Joe to an air strip, where his private plane is unable to take off. Joe says goodbye to Gloria, but she promises to wait and gives him the ring.

Cast    
Gerald Mohr as Joe Sapelli
Dorothy Patrick as Gloria Dell
Robert Rockwell as Dist. Atty. James Deveron
Charles Cane as Lt. Ralph Metzger
Larry J. Blake as Capt. Ed Roberts
Argentina Brunetti as Mama Sapelli
Richard Irving as Benny
Philip Van Zandt as Artie Jerome
Alex Frazer as Charles Winters
Ted Jacques as Bartender

References

External links
 
 

1949 films
American crime films
1949 crime films
Republic Pictures films
Films directed by Harry Keller
American black-and-white films
1940s English-language films
1940s American films